Alison Jacques is a contemporary art gallery in London, established in 2004 by Alison Jacques.

Details
Originally sited in a small townhouse off Bond Street, London W1, it relocated in 2007 to a  space at 16-18 Berners Street opposite the Sanderson Hotel in Fitzrovia. 

Since opening her own gallery in 2004, Jacques has developed an exhibition program of both unknown and established artists, representing the estates of artists including Mária Bartuszová, Lygia Clark, Roy Oxlade, Dorothea Tanning and Hannah Wilke. Jacques has worked with the estate of Robert Mapplethorpe since 1999. Her curatorial approach has been on unknown bodies of work by Mapplethorpe such as his early Polaroids from the 1970s and his works and sculptures.

In 2019, TimeOut ranked the gallery as one of the top 50 in London. Eddy Frankel said, "This Fitzrovia gallery has some serious art clout, representing Juergen Teller plus the estates of Robert Mapplethorpe and Ana Mendieta."

The gallery often holds events and talks in conjunction with the current exhibition, with curators and critics. The gallery has published books including Lygia Clark, Sheila Hicks, Dorothea Tanning and Hannah Wilke as well as supporting museum monographs on the gallery artists.

References

External links

Contemporary art galleries in London
Art galleries established in 2004
2004 establishments in England